Frontinella is a genus of dwarf spiders that was first described by Frederick Octavius Pickard-Cambridge in 1902.

Species
 it contains nine species and one subspecies, found in China, El Salvador, Mexico, and the United States:
Frontinella bella Bryant, 1948 – Hispaniola
Frontinella huachuca Gertsch & Davis, 1946 – USA, Mexico
Frontinella h. benevola Gertsch & Davis, 1946 – Mexico, Arizona
Frontinella hubeiensis Li & Song, 1993 – China
Frontinella laeta (O. Pickard-Cambridge, 1898) (type) – Mexico
Frontinella omega Kraus, 1955 – El Salvador
Frontinella potosia Gertsch & Davis, 1946 – Mexico
Frontinella pyramitela (Walckenaer, 1841) – North, Central America
Frontinella tibialis F. O. Pickard-Cambridge, 1902 – Mexico
Frontinella zhui Li & Song, 1993 – China

See also
 List of Linyphiidae species (A–H)
Neriene

References

Araneomorphae genera
Linyphiidae
Spiders of China
Spiders of North America
Taxa named by Frederick Octavius Pickard-Cambridge